A Piper PA-46 Malibu light aircraft transporting Argentine football player Emiliano Sala crashed in the English Channel off Alderney in the Channel Islands on 21 January 2019. It had been travelling from Nantes, France, to Cardiff, Wales. Sala was due to begin his career at Cardiff City.
 
After the search for survivors was abandoned on 24 January, a private search for wreckage was launched. Sala's body was recovered, but no trace of the pilot David Ibbotson was found.

The AAIB investigation found that Sala's body showed high levels of exposure to carbon monoxide which had leaked into the cabin of the aircraft and may have impaired the judgement of the pilot. Ibbotson was not licensed to fly at the time of the crash, or qualified to fly at night. David Henderson, who organised the flight and was originally scheduled to be the pilot, was charged with endangering the safety of an aircraft. He was found guilty on 28 October 2021, after a trial at Cardiff Crown Court.

Disappearance
The aircraft departed from Nantes Atlantique Airport at 19:15 GMT (20:15 CET) bound for Cardiff Airport. Sala had been signed two days previously by Cardiff City Football Club from FC Nantes. The pilot was identified by Guernsey Police as David Ibbotson. Ibbotson lost control of the aircraft while manoeuvring to avoid cloud, and the tailfin and part of both wings broke away with the speed in excess of the design limit.

The flight was arranged by football agent Willie McKay, who said that he was not involved in selecting the plane or the pilot. David Henderson had originally intended to fly the plane himself, but the flight was given to David Ibbotson. The flight plan showed that the plane was scheduled to take off at 09:00 GMT (10:00 CET) on 21 January, but was delayed until the evening.

Aircraft

The aircraft involved was a Piper PA-46 Malibu, a six-seat type equipped with a single piston engine, registered in the United States as N264DB, serial number 46-8408037. The aircraft was manufactured in 1984. The Certificate of Registration had been issued on 11 September 2015.

Ibbotson and Sala had expressed misgivings about the aircraft they were using. In a telephone conversation after landing at Nantes, Ibbotson described it as "dodgy" and recounted how he had heard a bang while they were mid-channel. And in a WhatsApp audio message just after takeoff on the return flight, Sala said "I am now on board a plane that seems like it is falling to pieces... If you do not have any more news in an hour and a half, I don't know if they need to send someone to find me. I am getting scared!" Cardiff City had offered Sala a commercial flight from Paris, but he said that he had made alternative arrangements and would be training with his new teammates on the morning after the flight.

The aircraft was registered to a trustee, the Southern Aircraft Consultancy in Bungay, Suffolk, United Kingdom.

Search

A search and rescue operation was launched, but was suspended at 02:00 GMT on 22 January due to worsening weather conditions. Although the area was outside the United Kingdom's area of responsibility, Her Majesty's Coastguard sent two helicopters to assist in the search for the aircraft. A French helicopter was also sent to participate in the search, as were the Alderney and Guernsey lifeboats.

The search resumed at 08:00 GMT on 22 January. By 11:45 GMT, a total of  had been covered by five aircraft and two lifeboats, but no trace of the aircraft had been found. A French Navy vessel also participated in the search. The search was again suspended in the evening of 22 January. Floating objects had been found, but it was not confirmed that they came from the missing aircraft. The search resumed at 08:00 GMT on 23 January with two aircraft searching coastal areas around Alderney. As of 11:30 GMT, a helicopter and three aircraft were continuing the search and trying to review satellite imagery and mobile phone data; there was still no trace of the missing aircraft.

On 23 January, the Channel Islands Air Search said they had abandoned hope of finding any survivors in the water. The search now focused on the possibility that survivors were on a life raft in the English Channel. The official search was called off on 24 January because the chances of survival were said to be "extremely remote". The search had covered  of land and sea, covering Burhou, Les Casquets, Alderney, the north coast of the Cherbourg Peninsula, and the north coast of Jersey and Sark.

Salvage activity
Sala's family launched a fundraising appeal to find his body and a private search was launched on 26 January, funded by £259,000 raised in donations, via website GoFundMe. On 28 January, marine scientist David Mearns, who led the search, announced that a search vessel with an unmanned remotely operated underwater vehicle (ROV) was expected to be in place "by the end of the week". In the meantime, two fishing boats were being used to carry out a surface search of the area. Mearns engaged the  FPV Morven for the search.

On 30 January 2019 the Air Accidents Investigation Branch (AAIB) reported that two seat cushions, found on a beach near Surtainville in France, were likely to be from the missing aircraft. The AAIB search carried out by the vessel Geo Ocean III started on 3 February, together with the private search, and was expected to last up to three days; the private search was set to continue "until the plane is located". The search area was divided between the two teams.

Images from the AAIB search remote submersible had shown the registration mark and at least one body inside the wreckage.

Sala's body was recovered from the wreckage on 7 February and taken to the Isle of Portland to be passed to the Dorset coroner. His body was identified by means of fingerprint evidence. Attempts to recover the aircraft wreckage were unsuccessful and poor weather conditions forced the salvage team to return the ROV to the ship. On 11 February, the results of a post-mortem reported that Sala had died of "head and trunk injuries".

The daughter of the pilot David Ibbotson launched a crowdfunding appeal to locate his body, which raised over £250,000, including a donation of £27,000 from French footballer Kylian Mbappé. The money raised was used to pay for a second dive to the wreck on 27 February and for a helicopter search of coastal areas in the Channel Islands, but no body was found.

Investigation
The crash site lies in international waters. Under Annex 13 to the Convention on Civil Aviation, the National Transportation Safety Board  (NTSB) had responsibility for investigating the accident because the aircraft was registered in the United States. The NTSB, in agreement with the Air Accidents Investigation Branch (AAIB) delegated responsibility for the investigation to the AAIB because the aircraft was based in the UK. On 23 January 2019, the AAIB opened an investigation into the accident. Assistance was given by France's Bureau d’Enquêtes et d’Analyses, the British Civil Aviation Authority, the European Union Aviation Safety Agency, Argentina's Junta de Investigación de Accidentes de Aviación Civil and the NTSB.

Part of the investigation covered the operational aspects related to the accident including licensing and flight plans. David Ibbotson had undergone training to become a commercial pilot between 2012 and 2014, but had dropped out before it was completed; his private pilot licence did not permit him to carry passengers for profit. Ibbotson's type rating for the Piper Malibu had expired months prior to the crash. While at Nantes Atlantique Airport, Ibbotson had posted on Facebook that he was "a bit rusty" with the instrument landing system on the Piper Malibu.

Post mortem tests on Sala's body showed exposure to carbon monoxide with a carboxyhemoglobin level of 58%, which could have led to symptoms including seizure, unconsciousness or a heart attack. The AAIB considers it likely that the pilot would also have been exposed to carbon monoxide. The AAIB said that it had no plans to raise the wreckage of the plane from the seabed, saying "In this case, we consider that it will not add significantly to the investigation and we will identify the correct safety issues through other means."

AAIB final report
The AAIB published its final report into the accident on 13 March 2020. It concluded that the pilot David Ibbotson was not licensed to fly the plane as his rating had expired in November 2018, and that he was not qualified to fly at night. The investigation stated that "neither the plane nor the pilot had the required licences or permissions to operate commercially." The report concluded that Sala would have been "deeply unconscious" due to carbon monoxide poisoning at the time of the crash, but that Ibbotson was still conscious and in control of the plane up to the time of the crash.

Inquest

Following Henderson's conviction in October 2021, the inquest into the two deaths opened on 15 February 2022 in Bournemouth. It concluded on 17 March with the verdict that Sala and Ibbotson had been affected by carbon monoxide poisoning from the plane's engine before the crash. The jury said that Ibbotson may have "felt under pressure" to fly due to the importance of the customer, while the coroner called for tighter regulation of unlicensed commercial flights.

Legal proceedings

In September 2019, the director of the company responsible for security at the mortuary in Bournemouth was jailed for 14 months, for accessing CCTV footage of Sala's post-mortem and posting it on Twitter. One of her employees was jailed for 5 months on the same charge of computer misuse.

In June 2019, Dorset Police arrested David Henderson on suspicion of manslaughter by an unlawful act in respect of the death of Sala. Henderson had arranged the flight and had originally intended to fly the plane. Police decided not to proceed with the case for manslaughter, but on 26 October, Henderson appeared at Cardiff Crown Court, via video link, charged with endangering the safety of an aircraft and attempting to discharge a passenger without valid permission or authorisation. Henderson pleaded not guilty to both charges and was granted bail until 18 October 2021. On that date, he pleaded guilty to a charge of attempting to discharge a passenger without permission or authorisation. On 28 October, Henderson was convicted on the charge of endangering the safety of an aircraft, and jailed for eighteen months.

See also
 2017 Sydney Seaplanes DHC-2 crash - another light aircraft crash caused by carbon monoxide poisoning in the cockpit

References

External links
 AAIB Special Bulletin S1/2019 on Piper PA-46-310P Malibu, N264DB at www.gov.uk
 Emiliano Sala plane crash: The story behind the transfer flights BBC News, 19 March 2019
 Emiliano Sala: 'A tragic plane crash; a stain on football's reputation' BBC News, 17 October 2022

2010s missing person cases
Accidents and incidents involving the Piper PA-46 Malibu
Aviation accidents and incidents in 2019
Aviation accidents and incidents in the Channel Islands
Cardiff City F.C.
FC Nantes
Formerly missing people
History of Guernsey
January 2019 events in Europe
Missing aviators
Missing person cases in Europe
People lost at sea
Sports-related aviation accidents and incidents